The Beaver River Railroad Bridge crosses the Beaver River in New Brighton, Pennsylvania, carrying the tracks of the Fort Wayne Line. It was built in 1926, to a design by J.F. Leonard, the Pennsylvania Railroad's engineer in charge of bridges and buildings, for the Pittsburgh, Fort Wayne and Chicago Railway. It replaced an 1887 span, which was converted to road use, continuing in that role until it was replaced in 1985.

See also
List of bridges documented by the Historic American Engineering Record in Pennsylvania

References

External links

Historic American Engineering Record in Pennsylvania
Railroad bridges in Pennsylvania
Bridges over the Beaver River (Pennsylvania)
Steel bridges in the United States
Girder bridges in the United States
Warren truss bridges in the United States
Bridges in Beaver County, Pennsylvania